The 2017 Team Long Track World Championship was the 11th annual FIM Team Long Track World Championship. The final took place on 24 September 2017 in Roden, Drenthe, Netherlands.

Results
  Roden, Drenthe
 24 September 2017

See also
 2017 Individual Long Track World Championship
 2017 Speedway World Cup

References

Team Long Track World Championship